The 1962 Ohio State Buckeyes football team represented the Ohio State University in the 1962 Big Ten Conference football season. The Buckeyes compiled a 6–3 record.

Schedule

Game summaries

North Carolina

    
    
    
    
    
    
    

John Mummey 15 Rush Att, 110 Yds, 1TD; 1/1 passing, 42 yards, 1 TD

UCLA

Illinois

Northwestern

Wisconsin

Iowa

Indiana

Oregon

Michigan

Coaching staff
 Woody Hayes – Head Coach – 12th year

1963 pro draftees

References

Ohio State
Ohio State Buckeyes football seasons
Ohio State Buckeyes football